Velikite Balgari (The Great Bulgarians) was the Bulgarian spin-off of the 2002 program 100 Greatest Britons produced by the BBC. Aired on the Bulgarian National Television's Kanal 1, its first stage began on 9 June 2006 and finished on 10 December, with a show on 23 December announcing the names of the Top 100 as chosen by popular vote. The Top 10 were announced in alphabetical order. In the second stage, which lasted until 17 February 2007, the viewers determined the order in the Top 10. Documentaries dedicated to every Top 10 personality were aired during the second stage.

1–10

 Vasil Levski (1837–1873), revolutionary and national hero
 Peter Deunov (1864–1944), spiritual master of a school of Esoteric Christianity
 Asparukh of Bulgaria (d. 681), founder of the First Bulgarian Empire
 Tsar Simeon I of Bulgaria (c. 866–927), ruled during the Golden Age of Bulgarian culture and military power
 Hristo Botev (1848–1876), national poet and revolutionary
 Knyaz Boris I of Bulgaria (d. 907), ruled during the Christianization of Bulgaria
 Saints Cyril and Methodius (9th century), devised and spread the Glagolitic alphabet
 Stefan Stambolov (1854–1895), successful Prime Minister
 Ivan Vazov (1850–1921), national writer
 Saint Paisius of Hilendar (1722–1773), wrote Istoriya Slavyanobolgarskaya

11–100

 John Atanasoff (1903–1995) Physicist and inventor credited with inventing the first digital computer 
 Hristo Stoichkov (1966–) The greatest Bulgarian football player
 Baba Vanga (1911–1996) claimed mystic 
 Todor Zhivkov (1911–1998) The communist leader of the People's Republic of Bulgaria (PRB) from 4 March 1954 until 10 November 1989.
 Georgi Asparuhov (1943–1971) football player
 Tsar Kaloyan of Bulgaria (1170–1207) Tsar of Bulgaria
 Khan Krum of Bulgaria Khan of Bulgaria
 Tsar Ivan Asen II of Bulgaria Emperor
 Vladimir Dimitrov (1882–1960) painter
 St John of Rila (876–946) The first Bulgarian hermit
 Azis (1978–) Chalga singer
 Ivan Kostov (1949–) 47th Prime Minister
 Aleko Konstantinov (1863–1897) writer, known for Bay Ganyo
 Volen Siderov (1956–) politician
 Georgi Benkovski (1843–1876) revolutionary
 Neno Yurukov (1978 -) physics teacher at 91 German Language High school  
 Slavi Trifonov (1966–) actor and singer
 Nikola Vaptsarov (1909–1942) poet, communist and revolutionary, shot to death at 32 because of his revolutionary ideology
 Boyko Borisov (1959–) 50th Prime Minister of Bulgaria
 Lili Ivanova (1939–) singer
 Dan Koloff (1892–1940) wrestler and mixed martial artist
 Khan Kubrat
 Tonka Obretenova (1812–1893) revolutionary
 Georgi Rakovski (1821–1867) freemason and writer
 Petko Voyvoda (1844–1900) haydut leader and freedom fighter
 Rayna Knyaginya (1856–1917) teacher and revolutionary
 Valya Balkanska (1942–) folk music singer
 Georgi Dimitrov (1882–1949) communist politician
 Albena Denkova (1974–) ice dancer
 Ghena Dimitrova (1941–2005) operatic soprano
 Evlogi (1819–1897) merchant, banker and Hristo Georgiev
 Atanas Burov (1875–1954) banker and politician
 Kolyu Ficheto (1800–1881) architect and sculptor
 Emil Dimitrov (1940–2005) singer                                                                                                 
 St Evtimiy, Patriarch of Tarnovo Patriarch of Bulgaria
 Tsar Samuil of Bulgaria Tsar of the First Bulgarian Empire
 Aleksandar Stamboliyski (1879–1923) Prime Minister
 Georgi Partsalev (1925–1989) film actor
 Zahari Stoyanov (1850–1889) writer and historian
 Nikolay Haytov (1919–2002) fiction writer
 St Clement of Ohrid (840?–916) saint and scholar
 Veselin Topalov (1975–) chess Grandmaster
 Yordan Yovkov (1880–1937) writer
 Gotse Delchev (1872–1903) revolutionary figure
 Peyo Yavorov (1878–1914) Symbolist poet
 Rayna Kabaivanska (1934–) opera singer
 Khan Tervel of Bulgaria Khan of Bulgaria
 Ahmed Dogan (1954–) politician of Turkish descent
 Hadzhi Dimitar (1840–1868) voivode and revolutionary who wrote for the Liberation of Bulgaria from Ottoman rule.
 Tsar Boris III of Bulgaria (1894–1943) Tsar of Bulgaria
 Neshka Robeva (1946–) former Rhythmic Gymnast and coach
 Nevena Kokanova (1938–2000) film actress
 Boris Christoff (1914–1993) opera singer
 Yordan Radichkov (1929–2004) writer and playwright
 Yane Sandanski (1872–1915) national hero
 Dimitar Peshev (1894–1973) Deputy Speaker of the National Assembly of Bulgaria and Minister of Justice
 Elin Pelin (1877–1949) writer, best narrator of country life
 Vasil Aprilov (1789–1847) educator
 Apostol Karamitev (1923–1973) actor
 Georgi Parvanov (1957–) 3rd President of Bulgaria from 2002 to 2012
 Dimcho Debelyanov (1887–1916) poet
 Zahari Zograf (1810–1853) painter
 Panayot Volov (1850-1876) revolutionary
 Sergey Stanishev (1966–) President of the Party of European Socialists since November 2011 and Member of the European Parliament
 Simeon Sakskoburggotski (1937–) Last reigning Bulgarian monarch
 Lyudmila Zhivkova (1942–1981) politician, art historian
 Dimitar and Konstantin Miladinovi (1810–1862 and 1830–1862, respectively) poets and folklorists
 Stefan Karadzha (1840–1868) national hero
 Nicolai Ghiaurov (1929–2004) opera singer
 Stoyanka Mutafova (1922–2019) actress
 Capt. Dimitar Spisarevski (1916–1943) fighter pilot
 Lyuben Karavelov (1834–1879) writer
 Stefka Kostadinova (1965–) athlete who competed in high jump
 Hristo Smirnenski (1898–1923) poet and prose writer
 Major General Georgi Ivanov (1940–) military officer and first Bulgarian cosmonaut
 Petar Beron (1799–1871) educator
 Valeri Petrov (1920–2014) poet
 Georgi Kaloyanchev (1925–2012) actor
 Geo Milev (1895–1925) poet and journalist
 Sophronius of Vratsa (1739–1813) cleric
 Ekaterina Dafovska (1975–) Biathlete, the only Bulgarian who won a gold metal at Winter Olympics
 Dimitar Talev (1898–1966) writer
 Todor Aleksandrov (1881–1924) freedom fighter
 Pencho Slaveykov (1866–1912) poet
 Filip Kutev (1903–1982) composer
 Krakra of Pernik feudal lord
 Ivet Lalova (1984–) Bulgarian athlete, sprint events
 Panayot Hitov (1830–1918) hajduk and voivode
 Khan Omurtag of Bulgaria Great Khan
 Prof. Asen Zlatarov (1885–1936) biochemist

See also

 100 greatest Britons
 Greatest Britons spin-offs
 List of Bulgarians

References

External links
 Official website of Velikite Balgari

2006 Bulgarian television series debuts
2007 Bulgarian television series endings
Bulgarian television series
Bulgarians
Lists of Bulgarian people
2000s Bulgarian television series